Mis Favoritas may refer to:

 Mis Favoritas (Juan Gabriel album), 2010
 Mis Favoritas (Toby Love album), 2012
 Mis Favoritas (Víctor Manuelle album), 2010
 Mis Canciones Favoritas, a 2003 album by Chenoa